Anna Gual Rovirosa (born May 30, 1996) is a Spanish female water polo player who won the silver medal at the 2017 FINA World Championships

In 2018 she won the gold medal at the Mediterranean Games and the bronze at the European Water Polo Championship

See also
 List of World Aquatics Championships medalists in water polo

References

External links

Spanish female water polo players
Living people
1996 births
Water polo players from Barcelona
World Aquatics Championships medalists in water polo
Mediterranean Games gold medalists for Spain
Mediterranean Games medalists in water polo
Competitors at the 2018 Mediterranean Games
21st-century Spanish women